Capitaine Phœbus de Châteaupers  is a fictional character and one of the main antagonists in Victor Hugo's 1831 novel, Notre-Dame de Paris. He is the Captain of the King Louis XI's Archers. His name comes from Phoebus, the Greek god of the sun (also called Apollo).

In the novel
In the original novel, Phoebus is an antagonist. Despite being of noble birth and very handsome, he is also vain, untrustworthy, and a womanizer. He saves Esmeralda from Quasimodo and she falls in love with him. Phoebus makes a convincing show of returning her affections, but merely wants a night of passion. Esmeralda arranges to meet Phoebus and tells him of her love for him, and he convinces her that he feels the same way about her. He is in fact engaged to his cousin, Fleur-de-Lys de Gondelaurier, a spiteful socialite who is jealous of Esmeralda's beauty. Not only that, he has agreed to let Archdeacon Claude Frollo spy on his meeting with Esmeralda.

This decision proves his undoing, since as the couple prepare to have sex, the jealous Frollo attacks Phoebus and stabs him in the back. Frollo makes a quick get-away and Phoebus is presumed dead, with Esmeralda, being the only one present, presumed to be the killer. Phoebus, however, is not dead and soon recovers from his injury. But this does not stop Esmeralda from being tried and sentenced to death for attempted murder and witchcraft. Phoebus has the power to prove her innocence, but he remains silent for fear of having his adultery exposed. In the end of the novel, he marries Fleur-de-Lys, and watches Esmeralda's execution with apparently little or no remorse. While Phoebus is one of the few characters to survive in the novel, he does not escape punishment entirely, as Hugo implies that his marriage will not be a happy or romantic one, condemning him to a miserable life.

Adaptations
Among the actors who have played Phoebus over the years in each adaptation of the novel are:

Disney version

In the first film
In the 1996 animated Disney adaptation of The Hunchback of Notre Dame, Phoebus serves a supporting protagonist, and his character is combined with that of Pierre Gringoire from Victor Hugo's original novel. He was voiced by Kevin Kline and animated by Russ Edmonds. He returns to Paris from the wars to be Captain of the Guard under Frollo, who is portrayed as a judge in this version, because his predecessor was a "bit of a disappointment" to Frollo. However, Phoebus begins to harbor a great dislike towards Frollo for his harsh methods, and displays sympathy towards the downtrodden and poor, shown when he steps in to stop two of Frollo's thugs from arresting Esmeralda for stealing money (which was honestly obtained), and requests to stop the citizens from torturing Quasimodo at the Festival of Fools. He becomes fond of Esmeralda, such as complimenting her for fighting as well as a man, and the two truly fall in love (unlike the Phoebus from the novel, who only wanted passion from Esmeralda). Midway through the film, as Frollo descends into a homicidal madness and burns down almost half the city in his ruthless manhunt for Esmeralda, after developing a lust for her, Phoebus becomes increasingly disgusted with Frollo's behavior. He finally rebels against Frollo when he objects to burning an innocent family's house with them inside just because they had given shelter to Roma in the past with no evidence that they have any knowledge of Esmeralda's current whereabouts. He is immediately sentenced to death for his rebellion and, after attempting to escape from Frollo and his men, is almost killed by being struck by an arrow and falling into the River Seine, but is rescued by Esmeralda from drowning. Esmeralda takes him to Notre Dame and leaves him in Quasimodo's care. Despite Quasimodo distrusting him, he and Phoebus join forces to find the Court of Miracles, the Traveller hideout, before Frollo attacks, but they are all captured when it is revealed that Frollo tricked them into helping him find the Court.

In the climactic battle, Phoebus escapes captivity to rally the French citizens to fight against Frollo's thugs and liberate their city. He pursues Frollo into the cathedral and witnesses both Frollo and Quasimodo fall from the balcony, catching Quasimodo in time to save his life. In the aftermath, Phoebus steps aside to let Quasimodo have a chance with Esmeralda, but Quasimodo sees that Esmeralda loves Phoebus, and blesses their romance as they embrace him as a true friend.

In the second film
In Disney's 2002 direct-to-video sequel, The Hunchback of Notre Dame II, Phoebus (again voiced by Kline) is married to Esmeralda and they have a young son, Zephyr, who resembles him. He continues to serve as Captain of the Guard under the new Minister of Justice, and investigates a series of thefts throughout Paris which coincide with the arrival of a Romani circus troupe, led by Sarousch. His investigation leads him to conclude that Sarousch and his accomplice, Madelleine, are the culprits, putting a strain on his friendship with Quasimodo, who is developing a budding relationship with Madelleine. Sarousch fools Phoebus into thinking Madelleine is the sole thief so that he can steal La Fidèle, Notre Dame's most valuable bell. However, in the process, Zephyr is kidnapped. Phoebus leads the city guard to trap Sarousch, who almost escapes by holding Zephyr hostage. When Madelleine and Quasimodo rescue Zephyr, Phoebus and his men arrest Sarousch. At the Festival of Romance, he loudly declares his enduring love for his wife.

Later Disney appearances
This incarnation of Phoebus makes his debut appearance in the Kingdom Hearts series in Kingdom Hearts 3D: Dream Drop Distance, but voiced by Phil LaMarr. His role in the game is identical to the first film.

References

 The Hunchback of Notre Dame: Characters at SparkNotes.com
 Rebello, Stephen. The Art of The Hunchback of Notre Dame (1996) 

The Hunchback of Notre-Dame characters
Fictional military captains
Fictional French people
Fictional police officers
Fictional French people in literature
Literary characters introduced in 1831
Fictional nobility
Male characters in literature
Male literary villains